Yield protection, commonly referred to as Tufts syndrome, is an alleged admissions practice in which an academic institution rejects or delays the acceptance of highly qualified students on the grounds that such students are likely to be accepted by, and then enroll in, more prestigious institutions. The purpose of the practice is to prevent reductions in yield, a statistic that reflects the proportion of students that accept their admissions offer.

An alternate view holds that yield protection is a myth propagated by students who failed to gain admission to an academic institution. This view proposes that, rather than yield protection, it is actually negative subjective factors in an application that may contribute to a rejection, despite the applicant's strong qualifications.

See also 
 College admissions in the United States
 Matriculation

References 

University and college admissions